Temasek Holdings (Private) Limited, or simply Temasek, is a Singaporean state holding company owned by the Government of Singapore. Incorporated on 25 June 1974, its net portfolio is US$287 billion (S$403 billion) as of 2022, with S$37 billion divested and S$61 billion invested during the year. 

Its one-year total shareholder return (TSR) was 5.81%, with longer term 10 and 20-year TSRs at 7% and 8% respectively, compounded annually. Its TSR since inception was 14%, compounded over 48 years. 

Headquartered in Singapore, it has 12 offices in 8 countries around the world, including in Beijing, Hanoi, Mumbai, Shanghai, Shenzhen; and London, Brussels, New York, San Francisco, Washington, D.C. and Mexico City outside Asia. It is an active shareholder and investor, with four key structural trends guiding its long term portfolio construction – Digitisation, Sustainable Living, Future of Consumption, and Longer Lifespans. Temasek's portfolio covers a broad spectrum of sectors. Its key focus investment areas include Consumer, Media & Technology, Life Sciences & Agri-Food, and Non-bank Financial Services.

Temasek has held overall corporate global credit ratings of “Aaa/AAA” by rating agencies Moody's and Standard & Poor's respectively since its inaugural credit ratings in 2004. It has also attained perfect quarterly scores on the Linaburg-Maduell Transparency Index, a measure of the openness of government-owned investment funds. Temasek is primarily anchored in Asia, but with a global portfolio, with a 65% underlying exposure to developed economies.

While Temasek is largely attributed as being a sovereign wealth fund (SWF), there are major differences as it invests mostly in equities, is the outright owner of many assets and companies, and pays taxes like other commercial investment firms. 

In addition to Temasek, the Government of Singapore also owns GIC Private Limited, a traditional SWF which manages about US$744 billion (S$1.006 trillion) of assets as of 2022 and the compulsory pension program Central Provident Fund with asssets of US$397 billion (S$540 billion), giving a total AUM of US$1.64 trillion.

Status
Temasek is a company incorporated in Singapore, and operates under the provisions of the Singapore Companies Act. It is neither a government agency nor a statutory board. Like any other commercial company, Temasek pays taxes that contributes to government revenue in the countries it operates in, distributes dividends to its shareholder and has its own board of directors and a professional management team. Its sole shareholder is Singapore's Ministry of Finance.

Temasek is designated a Fifth Schedule entity under the Constitution of Singapore, which imposes certain safeguards to protect the government's past reserves. For instance, the approval of the President of Singapore is required for any transaction which is likely to result in a draw-down of Temasek's cash reserves. The president also has the right to appoint, terminate, or renew the members of Temasek's board of directors. In most other respects, however, Temasek operates as an independent commercial investment holding company.

In a 2009 speech, Ho Ching, Temasek Holdings' Executive Director and CEO, said that the company had made an effort to instill discipline and professionalism, and to be tested and measured by providing public markers of performance. She noted that Temasek's bonds spreads and credit ratings have been regularly and independently monitored as public markers of Temasek's financial position and credit risks. Temasek had also openly and accurately disclosed its financial information through its annual report (although Ho said that, as a private company, it was not legally obliged to do so).

History
At the point of Singapore's independence in August 1965, the Government of Singapore had ownership or joint ownership of various local companies, such as Malaysia-Singapore Airlines (later split up into Malaysia Airlines and Singapore Airlines) and the Singapore Telephone Board (which became Singapore Telecommunications). As part of its push for local and foreign private investment in sectors such as manufacturing and shipbuilding, the government's Economic Development Board (EDB) also bought minority stakes in a variety of local companies. During the first ten years after independence, the government acquired or established several companies, such as the Keppel Corporation (originally Keppel Shipyard, taken over from the Royal Navy after the British military withdrawal from Singapore), ST Engineering (originally a weapon manufacturer set up to supply the Singapore Armed Forces), and the shipping company Neptune Orient Lines.

On 25 June 1974, Temasek was incorporated under the Singapore Companies Act to hold and manage the assets previously held directly by the Singapore government, named for an early settlement on the island. The goal was for Temasek to own and manage these investments on a commercial basis, allowing the Ministry of Finance and the Ministry of Trade and Industry to focus on policymaking.

In February 2020, Temasek announced a company-wide wage freeze and voluntary pay cuts for senior management in part to help fund community programs aimed at alleviating the impact of COVID-19.

On 1 October 2021, Dilhan Pillay Sandrasegara, the current chief executive officer of Temasek International (TI), succeeded Ho Ching as executive director and chief executive officer of Temasek Holdings.

Investments
Temasek's initial portfolio of S$354 million comprised shares previously held by the Singapore Government, including a bird park, a hotel, a shoemaker, a detergent producer, naval yards converted into a ship repair business, a start-up airline, and an iron and steel mill.

2000s
Temasek's 2006 acquisition of Shin Corporation, owned by the family of then Thai prime minister Thaksin Shinawatra, was particularly controversial, with protestors burning effigies of Lee and Ho on the streets of Bangkok. The deal was a factor in exacerbating the Thai political crisis, which eventually led to the downfall of Thaksin and a review of the transaction's legality. The military junta that overthrew Thaksin later tried unsuccessfully to force Temasek to divest a large part of its investment in Shin Corp. As of 2015, Temasek's stake in Intouch Corporation (as Shin Corporation was renamed) had reduced to 42%. In 2016, Temasek sold a further 21% stake in Intouch Holdings, the Thai telecoms conglomerate formerly known as Shin Corp.

2010s
In June 2018, Temasek invested S$340 million in a minority stake in UST Global, a digital technology services company. The size of the stake was not disclosed.

Temasek purchased 30 per cent of Haldor Topsoe's shares in March 2019. The investment company was selected in recognition of the value that it would add through its deep insights and connections in Asian growth and other emerging markets, according to the Danish engineering firm. The transaction price was not disclosed.

Beginning in 2015, Temasek began making large investments in agricultural and agricultural-related companies and ventures.

In February 2019, Temasek invested in Zilingo.

2020s
In August 2020, Temasek Holdings added a 3.9 per cent stake in BlackRock Inc, worth about US$3.5 billion, becoming one of its largest shareholders. According to people familiar with the matter, Temasek was one of several players that bought the money manager's shares when PNC Financial Services Group Inc. sold a US$14 billion stake earlier in the year.

In November 2020 Temasek with Creadev led a EUR140 million series C financing of French biotechnology company InnovaFeed.

In 2021, Temasek invested in cryptocurrency exchange FTX. Following FTX's collapse in November 2022, Temasek wrote down the value of their $275 million investment in FTX to zero.

In February 2022, Temasek led a $200 million fundraising round for a Singaporean cryptocurrency financing company, Amber Group.

In May 2022, Temasek was finalizing talks to lead a $50 million financing round for DotPe, an Indian startup backed by Google.

In August 2022, Temasek leads a $100 million financing round for Animoca Brands.

Sustainability 
As a company, Temasek has been carbon neutral since 2020. The firm has publicly stated that its goal is to reduce the net carbon emissions attributed to its entire portfolio to half of 2010 levels by 2030. It aims to achieve net zero carbon emissions by 2050.

See also
 Government of Singapore Investment Corporation (GIC)

References

External links
 

 
Government-owned companies of Singapore
Investment companies of Singapore
Financial services companies established in 1974
Singaporean companies established in 1974
Sovereign wealth funds